Lin Chung-chiu (born 23 September 1958 in Fengyuan City, Taichung County (now part of Taichung City), Taiwan) is a retired Taiwanese professional baseball player(position: first baseman, outfielder or designated hitter) and currently a baseball coach. During the 1980s Lin spent most of his amateur career in Japan and attended the 1988 Olympics for the Chinese Taipei national baseball team. After Professional baseball in Taiwan's debut in 1990, Lin left Japan to join CPBL's Mercuries Tigers in July 1990 and stayed with the team until its collapse in November 1999. He later played for the Sinon Bulls(2000~2001) and Chinatrust Whales(2002), and retired as a player midway in the Whale's 2002 season. Right after his retirement Lin was immediately promoted as the Whale's head coach until the end of CPBL's 2003 season. Between 2004 and 2006 Lin ran a small restaurant in his Fengyuan hometown. In early 2007, Lin returned to CPBL as Sinon Bulls' hitting coach and holds the position to date.

Despite his relative short figure, Lin is well known for his excellent batting skills and led the CPBL in home runs in the 1991, 1992, 2000 and 2001 seasons, at the age of 43. Throughout his Professional Baseball in Taiwan career he hit 162 home runs, which was only surpassed by Chang Tai-Shan and Hsieh Chia-hsien as of 2008.

Basic Information
Number: 6 (1990~2002 as player), 67 (2002 as coach ~ present)
Height: 167 cm
Weight: 83 kg
Bats/Throws: Right/Right

Career statistics
Bold letter indicates leading in the CPBL league

References

 

1958 births
Living people
Baseball players at the 1988 Summer Olympics
Mercuries Tigers players
Olympic baseball players of Taiwan
Baseball players from Taichung
Chinatrust Whales managers